The 1942–43 season was the second season of the Fort Wayne Zollner Pistons franchise in the National Basketball League. The Pistons came into the season off of a championship appearance and ended the year with a 17-6 record that earned them the #1 seed in the playoffs and set the team up as clear favorites to win the championship. After defeating Chicago in the first round in 3 games the Pistons were upset by the Sheboygan Red Skins in the NBL Championship Series. After the season Redskins guard Buddy Jeanette joined Fort Wayne to form one of the best backcourts in NBL History with Bobby McDermott, along with one of basketballs earliest examples of a super team.

Roster

League standings

References

Fort Wayne Zollner Pistons seasons
Fort Wayne